Chalcopasta is a genus of owlet moths in the family Noctuidae. There are about nine described species in Chalcopasta.

Species
These nine species belong to the genus Chalcopasta:
 Chalcopasta acantha Druce, 1889
 Chalcopasta acema (Druce, 1889)
 Chalcopasta ellica Dyar, 1915
 Chalcopasta fulgens Barnes & McDunnough, 1912
 Chalcopasta howardi (H. Edwards, 1877)
 Chalcopasta pterochalcea Dyar, 1909
 Chalcopasta riandana Dyar, 1912
 Chalcopasta sinuata Hampson, 1918
 Chalcopasta territans (H. Edwards, 1884)

Former species
 Chalcopasta koebelei is now Argentostiria koebelei (Riley, 1893)

References

 Chalcopasta at Markku Savela's Lepidoptera and Some Other Life Forms
 Natural History Museum Lepidoptera genus database

Hadeninae